Oancea is a commune in Galați County, Western Moldavia, Romania with a population of 1,546 people. It is composed of two villages, Oancea and Slobozia Oancea. 

It is also a border crossing between Moldova and Romania.

Natives
 Duncan Renaldo

References

Communes in Galați County
Localities in Western Moldavia
Moldova–Romania border crossings
Populated places on the Prut